In probability theory and statistics, the normal-exponential-gamma distribution (sometimes called the NEG distribution)  is a three-parameter family of continuous probability distributions. It has a location parameter , scale parameter   and a shape parameter  .

Probability density function
The probability density function (pdf) of the normal-exponential-gamma distribution is proportional to 

,

where D is a parabolic cylinder function.

As for the Laplace distribution, the pdf of the NEG distribution can be expressed as a mixture of normal distributions,

where, in this notation, the distribution-names should be interpreted as meaning the density functions of those distributions.

Within this scale mixture, the scale's mixing distribution (an exponential with a gamma-distributed rate) actually is a Lomax distribution.

Applications 

See also 
 Compound probability distribution
 Lomax distribution

References

Continuous distributions
Compound probability distributions